"Tere Mere Beech Mein" ("Between You and Me") is an Indian Hindi song from the Bollywood film Ek Duuje Ke Liye (1981). The song was composed by Laxmikant–Pyarelal. Anand Bakshi was the lyricist of this song and he won a Filmfare Award for Best Lyricist award for penning it. The song was sung by Lata Mangeshkar and S. P. Balasubrahmanyam. Britney Spears' 2003 smash hit single Toxic samples some of the song.

Theme 
In the song, the lyricist claims that he has a long-standing relationship and a deep bond with his lover. Neither of them is able to understand the reason or the depth of the relationship. Each of them remains sleepless at night, pining for the other. If one of them is in trouble, the other one feels troubled as well.

Awards and reception  
Anand Bakshi was the lyricist of this song, and he won a Filmfare Award for Best Lyricist in 1982. S P Balasubramanyam won the National Film Award for Best Male Playback Singer at the 29th National Film Awards "For great feeling and sense of rhythm which he brings to his vocal rendering".

References

External link 
  (uploaded 2008)

Indian songs
1981 songs
Hindi-language songs
Lata Mangeshkar songs
S. P. Balasubrahmanyam
Hindi film songs